Water-hemp or waterhemp is a common name for several plants and may refer:

In the genus Amaranthus:
Amaranthus australis - southern water-hemp
Amaranthus cannabinus - salt-marsh water-hemp, tidal marsh water-hemp or water-hemp pigweed 
Amaranthus floridanus - Florida water-hemp
Amaranthus tuberculatus - rough-fruit water-hemp or tall water-hemp 

In other genera:
Ayapana triplinervis